Edward John Abellera Barber (born July 15, 2000) is a Filipino-British actor and host who came to prominence in 2016, after joining the reality television series Pinoy Big Brother: Lucky 7, where he placed fourth.

Barber started his film career by playing the lead role in the romantic comedy Loving in Tandem (2017). He also played supporting roles in Seven Sundays (2017), Da One That Ghost Away (2018), and Fantastica (2018). He also starred in the drama television series Hiwaga ng Kambat (2019). In addition to acting, Barber ventured into the music industry with his debut studio album #E0806.

Early life 
Edward John Abellera Barber was born in Heidelberg, Germany, on July 15, 2000, to British-German entrepreneur Kevin and Filipina mother Cathy (née Abellera). He has an older sister.

Barber attended the European School, Karlsruhe in Germany where he discovered his interest for acting by joining the school's extra-curricular activities. Barber placed his education on hold when he joined Pinoy Big Brother.

Career 
Barber was sixteen when he was asked to audition online for Pinoy Big Brother after staff from The Filipino Channel took a photo of him in a Dolce Amore event in Germany. He succeeded in joining and was later introduced as the first contestant of the show. Barber was later announced as a semi-finalist on the show and had to temporarily exit due to the program's format. Meanwhile, Barber, together with the other semi-finalists, Maymay Entrata, and Kisses Delavin, took part in an online reality series called Follow the Lucky 3 Teens, which follows their journey after momentarily exiting the house. The show's finale was held on March 5, 2017 at the Alonte Sports Arena where he was declared as one of the runners-up, with Entrata winning the competition.

In September 2017 Maymay Entrata and Edward Barber, popularly known with their loveteam "MayWard", played the lead roles for their debut film, Loving in Tandem, which was released nationwide on September 13, 2017. Right after, he got a cameo role in the box office hit film Seven Sundays.

He joined Maymay to make a teleserye debut on the television series La Luna Sangre.

Other ventures

Philanthropy 

ELM Tree Foundation, a charity organization founded by Barber, his sister Laura, and Entrata, was formally launched on December 19, 2017. It takes its name from the initials of their name.

Endorsement 
Fresh from Pinoy Big Brother house, he together with on-screen partner Maymay Entrata joined McDonald's family as the newest endorsers of the new Creamy McFreeze. They also became one of the newest endorsers for Bench (Philippine clothing brand). MayWard joined the launching of Ariel Philippines’ new product, the NEW Ariel with Downy Perfume on May 18, 2017, with the  #ArielWhatAFeeling trending nationwide.

Filmography

Film

Television

Digital

Book

Discography

Album

Singles

Awards and nominations

References

External links 
 

2000 births
Living people
Filipino male film actors
ABS-CBN personalities
Pinoy Big Brother contestants
Star Magic
Star Music artists
British people of Filipino descent
Filipino people of German descent
German people of Filipino descent